is a former Japanese football player.

Club statistics

References

External links

1982 births
Living people
Tokai University alumni
Association football people from Miyazaki Prefecture
Japanese footballers
J1 League players
J2 League players
Japan Football League players
Avispa Fukuoka players
Honda Lock SC players
Association football defenders